Having it Off is a one-off TV comedy series for BBC Choice made by Red Production Company in 2002.

It was set at a cheap hairdressing salon in Eccles, Greater Manchester. It was shown only once and is not available yet on DVD.

Out gay bitchy stereotype Guy La Trousse (played by Antony Cotton, Coronation Street, Queer As Folk), desperately tries to escape the drudge of daily wash and crop and change the fortunes of the salon – and his career.

This is all thwarted by April, nymphomaniac loud-mouthed wife of the hairdressers owner.

The BBC website describes it as "rude, crude, strongly working-class sitcom on the lesser-seen BBC Choice, Having It Off promised much yet fell curiously short of the mark, lacking the key that would have propelled it to a higher level".

External links
 Comedy Guide

BBC television comedy
Television shows set in Manchester
2002 British television series debuts
2002 British television series endings
2000s British sitcoms
English-language television shows
Television series by Red Production Company